Epirobiidae is a family of air-breathing land snails, terrestrial gastropod mollusks in the superfamily Urocoptoidea.

Taxonomy 
The American malacologist Fred G. Thompson established the family Epirobiidae in 2012 for five genera of snails (Epirobia, Propilsbrya, Pectinistemma, Gyrocion, Prionoloplax), which were previously placed within the family Urocoptidae.

Genera 
Genera in the family Epirobiidae include:

 Epirobia Strebel & Pfeffer, 1880 -  the type genus of the family Epirobiidae, 13 species
 Propilsbrya Bartsch, 1906 - two species
 Pectinistemma Rehder, 1940 - five species
 Gyrocion Pilsbry, 1904 - probable placement within Epirobiidae; the single species is Gyrocion mirabilis (Pilsbry, 1904)
 Prionoloplax Pilsbry, 1953 - probable placement within Epirobiidae; the single species is Prionoloplax odontoplax (Pilsbry, 1953)

References